Valentyn Sapronov (23 January 1932 – 17 May 2019) was a Ukrainian association footballer from the Soviet Union-era who played for FC Shakhtar Donetsk.

In 1956, Sapronov played a game for Ukraine at the Spartakiad of the Peoples of the USSR.

References

1932 births
2019 deaths
People from Avdiivka
Soviet footballers
FC Shakhtar Donetsk players
Soviet football managers
FC Lokomotyv Donetsk managers
Association football forwards